Peter Gmür (born 15 May 1967) is a retired Swiss football defender.

References

1967 births
Living people
Swiss men's footballers
FC Luzern players
Association football defenders
Place of birth missing (living people)